Ahang may refer to:

Ahang Expressway, near Tehran, Iran
Ahang, Iran, a village near Tehran, Iran
Johannis "Ahang" Winar, Indonesian basketball coach and former player